Ekaterinoslavka is a rural locality (a village) in Shingak-Kulsky Selsoviet, Chishminsky District, Bashkortostan, Russia. The population was 34 as of 2010. There is 1 street.

Geography 
Ekaterinoslavka is located 17 km south of Chishmy (the district's administrative centre) by road.

References 

Rural localities in Chishminsky District